The Sakai–Kasahara scheme, also known as the Sakai–Kasahara key encryption algorithm (SAKKE), is an identity-based encryption (IBE) system proposed by Ryuichi Sakai and Masao Kasahara in 2003. Alongside the Boneh–Franklin scheme, this is one of a small number of commercially implemented identity-based encryption schemes. It is an application of pairings over elliptic curves and finite fields. A security proof for the algorithm was produced in 2005 by Chen and Cheng. SAKKE is described in Internet Engineering Task Force (IETF) RFC 6508.

As a specific method for identity-based encryption, the primary use case is to allow anyone to encrypt a message to a user when the sender only knows the public identity (e.g. email address) of the user. In this way, this scheme removes the requirement for users to share public certificates for the purpose of encryption.

Description of scheme
The Sakai–Kasahara scheme allows the encryption of a message  to an receiver with a specific identity, . Only the entity with the private key, associated to the identity, will be capable of decrypting the message.

As part of the scheme, both the sender and receiver must trust a Private Key Generator (PKG), also known as a Key Management Server (KMS). The purpose of the PKG is to create the receiver's private key, associated to the receiver's identity, . The PKG must securely deliver the identity-specific private key to the receiver, and PKG-specific public parameter, to all parties. These distribution processes are not considered as part of the definition of this cryptographic scheme.

Preliminaries
It is assumed:

 There is a bilinear map, a Tate-Lichtenbaum pairing,  from E to G. This means that for  a member of :

Key generation
The PKG generates the private key, for the user with identity  as follows:

Encryption
To encrypt a non-repeating message , the sender requires receiver's identity,  and the public PGK value . The sender performs the following operation.
 Create: 
 The sender generates  using  
 Generate the point  in :

 Create the masked message: 

 The encrypted output is: 
Note that messages may not repeat, as a repeated message to the same identity results in a repeated ciphertext. There is an extension to the protocol should messages potentially repeat.

Decryption
The decryption procedure is as follows:
 Compute 
 Receive the encrypted message: .
 Compute: 

 Extract the message: 

 To verify the message, compute , and only accept the message if:

Demonstration of algorithmic correctness
The following equations demonstrate the correctness of the algorithm:

By the bilinear property of the map:

As a result:

Standardisation
There are four standards relating to this protocol:
 Initial standardisation of scheme was begun by IEEE in 2006. 
 The scheme was standardised by the IETF in 2012 within RFC 6508.
 A key-exchange algorithm based on the scheme is the MIKEY-SAKKE protocol developed by the UK's national intelligence and security agency, GCHQ, and defined in RFC 6509.
 Sakai-Kasahara, as specified in MIKEY-SAKKE, is the core key-exchange algorithm of the Secure Chorus encrypted Voice over IP standard.

Security
In common with other identity-based encryption schemes, Sakai-Kasahara requires that the Key Management Server (KMS) stores a master secret from which all users' private keys can be generated. Steven Murdoch has criticised MIKEY-SAKKE for creating a security vulnerability through allowing the KMS to decrypt every users' communication. Murdoch also noted that the lack of forward secrecy in MIKEY-SAKKE increases the harm that could result from the master secret being compromised. GCHQ, the creator of MIKEY-SAKKE, disputed this analysis, pointing out that the some organisations may consider such monitoring capabilities to be desirable for investigative or regulatory reasons, and that the KMS should be protected by an air-gap.

Cryptographic libraries and implementations
The scheme is part of the MIRACL cryptographic library.

See also
 ID-based encryption
 wolfSSL : A SSL/TLS library that has integration with MIKEY SAKKE

References

Public-key encryption schemes
Pairing-based cryptography
Identity-based cryptography
Elliptic curve cryptography